Roberto Aquiles Aguilar Hernández (born 29 October 1964) is a Mexican politician affiliated with the Institutional Revolutionary Party. As of 2014 he served as Deputy of the LIX Legislature of the Mexican Congress representing Chiapas.

References

1964 births
Living people
People from Chiapas
Deputies of the LIX Legislature of Mexico
Institutional Revolutionary Party politicians
Members of the Chamber of Deputies (Mexico) for Chiapas